Luiza Rasulova (Луиза Расулова) (born April 24, 1995) is an Uzbek actress and presenter. Rasulova received widespread recognition and acclaim in Uzbekistan after starring in the 2012 Uzbek drama O Maryam, Maryam. Since then she has starred in many Uzbek comedy films Rasulova has also recorded a few songs.

Life
Luiza Rasulova was born on April 24, 1995 in Tashkent, Uzbekistan. Since she is not yet married, she lives with her mother and brothers. Luiza Rasulova began her professional career in 2010. The actress starred in the 2011 film "Yondiradi Kuydiradi", and in 2012 co-starred with singer Shahzoda and Ulugbek Kadyrov in the Uzbek film "O Maryam, Maryam" directed by Bakhrom Yakubov. After that, she became known as an actress. In 2017, she started working as the host of the show "Indigo" on Zo'r TV.

Education
The actress has a higher education. She graduated from high school in 2002-2011 and in grades 10-11 from 2011 to 2013. In 2013, she entered Taras Shevchenko National University of Kyiv, Faculty of Drama and Acting in Cinematography, and graduated in 2017. The actress speaks Uzbek, Russian, English and Ukrainian.

Charity
In 2019, she organized the "Roʻzgʻorga Barokat" charity foundation together with singer Rayhon Ganieva and Uzbek comedian Halima Ibragimova.

Filmography

Songs

References

External links
 
 Official Youtube channel
 Official Rizanova page

Uzbeks
1995 births
Living people
Uzbekistani film actresses
Uzbekistani television presenters
Uzbekistani women television presenters
21st-century Uzbekistani women singers
21st-century Uzbekistani actresses
People from Tashkent Region